Xītóu (溪头) may refer to: 

 Xitou, She County, Anhui, town in Anhui, China
 Xitou, Yangxi County, town in Guangdong, China
 Xitou Nature Education Area, in Nantou County, Taiwan